The Admiralty Court Act 1840 (3 & 4 Vict c 65) was an Act of the Parliament of the United Kingdom. It extended the jurisdiction of the High Court of Admiralty of England and Wales.

Content
Consisting of the following;

Whenever a vessel shall be arrested, etc., court to have jurisdiction over claims of mortgagees
Court to decide questions of title, etc.
The court in certain cases may adjudicate, etc.
Evidence may be taken viva voce in open court
Evidence may be taken viva voce before a commissioner
Attendance of witnesses and production of papers may be compelled by subpoena
Gaolers to receive prisoners committed by the Court of Admiralty or by Admiralty coroners
Prisoners in contempt may be discharged
Jurisdiction to try questions concerning booty of war
Jurisdiction of courts of law and equity not taken away

The Act was mentioned in articles concerning court proceedings dated 1973. 
 Together with the Admiralty Court Acts 1861, the review of the law was specifically for the reason of a need for an increased number of shipping, salvage, and collision hearings. The Bill for the Act was supported by the then Judge of the High Court of Admiralty, Stephen Lushington.

Viva voce

subpoena

Case summaries
Steamships Trading Company Ltd v Owners of the Ship ‘Samarai’ [1988] PGNC 99;
[1988-89] PNGLR 80 (28 February 1989)

See also
Admiralty law

References
John Mounteney Lely. "The Admiralty Court, 1840". The Statutes of Practical Utility. (Chitty's Statutes). Fifth Edition. Sweet and Maxwell. Stevens and Sons. Chancery Lane, London. 1894. Volume 1. Title "Admiralty". Pages 1 to 6.

English admiralty law
United Kingdom Acts of Parliament 1840
Acts of the Parliament of the United Kingdom concerning England